Dmitri Aleksandrovich Petrenko (born 18 June 1966) is a Russian professional football coach and a former player.

Club career
As a player, he made his debut in the Soviet Second League in 1984 for Torpedo Volzhsky.

Personal life
He is the father of Russian footballer Anton Petrenko.

References

1966 births
Living people
Soviet footballers
Russian footballers
Russian expatriate footballers
Expatriate footballers in Germany
Expatriate footballers in Kazakhstan
FC Energiya Volzhsky players
FC Rotor Volgograd players
SV Waldhof Mannheim players
FC Tekstilshchik Kamyshin players
Russian football managers
FC Metallurg Lipetsk players
Russian expatriate sportspeople in Kazakhstan
Association football forwards